Dallas: The Early Years  is a 1986 American made-for-television drama film and a prequel to the television series Dallas. The three-hour film aired on CBS on March 23, 1986 between the 26th and 27th episodes of the 1985–1986 ninth season of Dallas.

Plot
Written by series creator David Jacobs, the movie chronicles the exploits of Jock Ewing, Ellie Southworth, and Willard "Digger" Barnes from 1933 to 1951, and firmly established the background story of Dallas and how the long and ongoing feud between Jock and Digger started. Larry Hagman also appears in the opening sequence as his character, J.R. Ewing, being interviewed by a reporter who is researching the Barnes – Ewing feud.

While focusing on the triangle of Jock – Ellie – Digger, the movie also features Jock's brother, Jason, and Miss Ellie's father, Aaron, as starring characters. It shows the origins of the Ewing Oil, and Jock's schemings to make it big, and it deals with the inter-family relations of the Ewings, the Barnes, and the Southworths. It also shows Jock's first marriage to Amanda Lewis, and Ellie's relationship with her mother, Barbara, and brother, Garrison.

Cast
Starring
 David Grant as Willard "Digger" Barnes
 Dale Midkiff as Jock Ewing
 Molly Hagan as Ellie Southworth Ewing
 David Wilson as Jason Ewing, Jock's brother
 Hoyt Axton as Aaron Southworth, Miss Ellie's father

Introduced by
 Larry Hagman as (the contemporary) J.R. Ewing

Also starring
 Bill Duke as Seth Foster 
 Geoffrey Lewis as Ed Porter

Guest starring
 Diane Franklin as Amanda Lewis Ewing, Jock's first wife
 Marshall Thompson as Dr. Ted Johnson
 William Frankfather as Newman
 Wendel Meldrum as Honey
 Joe Rainer as Sam Culver 
 Marjie Rynearson as Barbara Southworth, Miss Ellie's mother
 Liz Keifer as Cherie Simmons
 Matt Mulhern as Garrison Southworth, Miss Ellie's brother
 Davis Roberts as the Preacher
 Kevin Wixted as young J.R. Ewing

Co-starring
Joe Berryman as Roscoe
Angie Bolling as Deborah Culver
Blue Deckert as Card Player
Cynthia Dorn as Jeanne
Bob Hannah as the Sheriff
Norma Moore as Maggie Barnes
Karen Radcliffe as the Hooker
Terrence Riggins as Benjamin Foster
Norma Allen as Townswoman
Jesse Baca as Driver
Ryan Beadle as young Bobby Ewing
Frank Bell as Sharecropper
Terry Evans as Young Man
Johnny Felder as young Cliff Barnes
Lee Gideon as Haskins
Max Harvey as Farmer
Rhashell Hunter as Priscilla Foster
Joyce Ingle as Townswoman
George Leverett as Square Dance Caller
Bennie Moore as young Benjamin Foster
Tony Morris as Ranch Hand
Chuck Page as Townsman
Peyton Park as the Justice
Jim Ponds as Farmer
Ray Redd as Townsman
Debra Lynn Rogeras as Joanne Haskins
Rose Mari Roundtree as Girlfriend
Mike Shanks as Hobo
Gena Sleete as Townswoman
Louanne Stephens as Woman
Fred Vest as Ranch Hand
Woody Watson as Legionnaire
Andrea Wauters as young Pamela Barnes
Bethany Wright as Laurette
Joel Allen as Gary Ewing (uncredited)

Home media
Warner Home Video released Dallas: The Early Years on DVD April 12, 2011 on Dallas: The Movie Collection 2-disc set.

References

External links

Ultimate Dallas: Official Guide to the series

1986 television films
1986 films
1986 drama films
Dallas (TV franchise) films
Dallas (TV franchise)
Films based on television series
Television films based on television series
CBS network films
Television prequel films
Films set in Dallas
Films set in 1933
Films set in the 1930s
Films set in 1951
Films set in the 1950s
American drama television films
Films directed by Larry Elikann
1980s American films
American prequel films